Op o' Me Thumb is a 1904 one-act play by the English authors Frederick Fenn and Richard Pryce. It was produced at the Court Theatre, London, on 13 March 1904, in a double bill with Robert Browning's A Soul's Tragedy. It transferred to the St James's Theatre on 24 April 1904. The leading role of Amanda was played by Hilda Trevelyan. The play was staged in New York in 1905 with Maude Adams as Amanda. It was filmed in 1920 as Suds, starring Mary Pickford in the role created by Trevelyan.

Characters and original cast
Madame Didier – Marianne Caldwell
Clem (Mrs) Galloway – Annie Howard
Rose Jordan – Margaret Busse
Celeste – Florence Lloyd
Amanda Afflick – Hilda Trevelyan
Horace Greensmith – H Nye Chart

Plot
The play is set in a London laundry. One of the workers, Amanda, fantasises about being the sweetheart of a handsome client, Horace, and tells her colleagues tall stories of their supposed romance. Horace arrives to collect his laundry; she confesses her deceit to him. Out of kindness he kisses her, and then goes, leaving Amanda alone, with her fantasies shattered but with the consolation of the kiss and his gold, diamond and ruby tie pin that he has given her.

Notes

References
 
 

1904 plays